Robert Liddle Farmhouse is a historic home located at Duanesburg in Schenectady County, New York. It was built about 1850 by noted master carpenter Alexander Delos "Boss" Jones.  It is a 2-story, three-bay, clapboard-sided frame farmhouse in the Greek Revival style. It has a -story east wing with a hipped roof.  It features a wide frieze and prominent corner pilasters.  Also on the property are a contributing barn, a garage, a shed, and a machine shed.

The property was covered in a study of Boss Jones TR

It was listed on the National Register of Historic Places in 1984.

References

Houses on the National Register of Historic Places in New York (state)
Greek Revival houses in New York (state)
Houses in Schenectady County, New York
National Register of Historic Places in Schenectady County, New York